Amphisbaena steindachneri is a species of worm lizard in the family Amphisbaenidae. The species is endemic to South America.

Etymology
The specific name, steindachneri, is in honor of Austrian herpetologist Franz Steindachner.

Geographic range
A. steindachneri is found in Bolivia, Brazil, and Paraguay.

Habitat
The preferred natural habitat of A. steindachneri is savanna.

Reproduction
A. steindachneri is oviparous.

References

Further reading
Boulenger GA (1885). Catalogue of the Lizards in the British Museum (Natural History). Second Edition. Volume II. ... Amphisbænidæ. London: Trustees of the British Museum (Natural History). (Taylor and Francis, printers). xiii + 497 pp. + Plates I-XXIV. (Amphisbæna steindachneri, pp. 444–445).
Dirksen L, De la Riva IJ (2000). "The lizards and amphisbaenians of Bolivia (Reptilia, Squamata): checklist, localities, and bibliography". Graellsia 55: 199–215. (Cercolophia steindachneri).
Gans C (2005). "Checklist and Bibliography of the Amphisbaenia of the World". Bulletin of the American Museum of Natural History (289): 1–130. (Cercolophia steindachneri, p. 26).
Mott T, Vieites DR (2009). "Molecular phylogenetics reveals extreme morphological homoplasy in Brazilian worm lizards challenging current taxonomy". Molecular Phylogenetics and Evolution 51 (2): 190–200. (Amphisbaena steindachneri).
Strauch A (1881). "Bemerkungen über die Eidechsenfamilie der Amphisbaeniden ". Mélanges biologiques tirés du Bulletin physico-mathématique de l'Académie impériale des Sciences de Saint-Pétersbourg 1: 355–479. (Amphisbaena steindachneri, new species, p. 407). (in German).

steindachneri
Reptiles described in 1881
Taxa named by Alexander Strauch